= Amir Rahimzadeh =

Iranian producer and investor (born 1984)

- امیر رحیم‌زاده
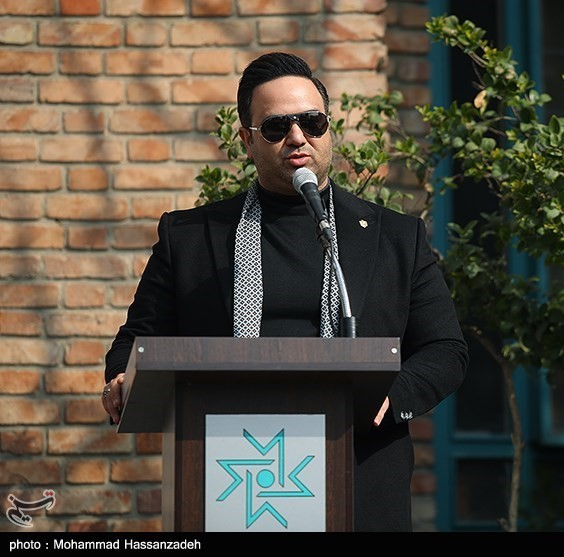
- Rahimzadeh at the 2023
- Born: July 28, 1983 (age 43); Mashhad, Iran
- Occupations: investor; producer
- Years active: 2016–present
- Website: https://amirrahimzadeh.ir

Amir Rahimzadeh (Persian: امیر رحیم‌زاده, born 28 July 1984) is an Iranian film, television, and home-video producer and investor. He has produced several works, including the home-video series Rest Easy. Rahimzadeh serves as the head of the Iranian Home-Video Investors Association and is a member of the Iranian Film Producers Association, the Visual Media Producers Guild, and the Assembly of Iran’s Comprehensive Audio-Visual Media Organization (Rasta).

== Career ==
Rahimzadeh serves as the head of the Iranian Home-Video Investors Association and is a member of the Iranian Film Producers Association, the Visual Media Producers Guild, and Rosta, Iran’s Organization of Comprehensive Audio and Visual Media.He is the owner of several platforms, including NetFilim, Art, Gisheh, and Red Lens—the first and only international submission platform—as well as the Gishe Ticket application. Rahimzadeh holds the licenses for the Honar Hashtom Film School, the Honari Ava Institute, and the Wooden Frame Acting Academy. He also serves as the chairman of the board at Rayan Film Productions, the Taban Gostar Honar Farda Advertising Agency, and Petro Artan Sadra Company. He holds a bachelor's degree in civil engineering and an ISO 9001 management certification.

== Filmography ==
=== Cinema ===
Year	Title	investor	Producer	source
2018	Girls Also Die	Yes	No	

=== television ===
Year	Title	investor	Producer	Notes	source
2016	Olympiads	Yes	No	8-episode TV series	

=== Home-video ===
Year	Title	investor	Producer	Notes	source
2022	Rest Easy	Yes	Yes	Short film	
2025	Side Roads	No	Yes	A 15-episode series is in production.	
2025	Opportunity	No	Yes	Home show program in production	
2025	The Wolf and the Flock	No	Yes	Home show program in production	
2025	Wolf	No	Yes	A 10-part series is in production.	
2025	Comeback	No	Yes	26-episode series	
2025	White Nightmare	No	Yes	8-episode series	
2025	Fold	No	Yes	10-episode series	
2025	The Easygoing Ones	No	Yes	Home show program in production	
2025	Maqam Music	No	Yes	The major home-video competition show is currently in production	
2025	Mirror	No	Yes	A competition show for the home-video market is currently in production	
